A Cartesian monoid is a monoid, with additional structure of pairing and projection operators. It was first formulated by Dana Scott and Joachim Lambek independently.

Definition 

 Monoid   is a monoid with identity 
 Left Projection     
 Right Projection   
 Surjective Pairing 
 Right Homogeneity  

References

Mathematical logic